The 2019 Nobel Peace Prize was awarded to the prime minister of Ethiopia Abiy Ahmed (b. 1976) "for his efforts to achieve peace and international cooperation, and in particular for his decisive initiative to resolve the border conflict with neighbouring Eritrea." The award was announced by the Norwegian Nobel Committee on 11 October 2019.

One year after Abiy received the prize, he presided over the outbreak of the Tigray War, which saw hundreds of thousands of casualties and led to the displacement of more than 800,000 persons. In response to the outbreak of hostilities, the Norwegian Nobel Committee released a statement in January 2022 which called the humanitarian situation "extremely serious"; said the lack of delivery of humanitarian aid to Tigray was "unacceptable"; and observed that "As Prime Minister and a winner of the Nobel Peace Prize, Abiy Ahmed has a special responsibility to end the conflict and help to create peace."

Candidates

Nobel Committee
Tasked with reviewing nominations from September of the previous year through February 1 and ultimately selecting the Prize winners, the members of the Norwegian Nobel Committee for 2019 were:

Berit Reiss-Andersen (chair, born 1954), advocate (barrister) and president of the Norwegian Bar Association, former state secretary for the Minister of Justice and the Police (representing the Labour Party). Member of the Norwegian Nobel Committee since 2012, reappointed for the period 2018–2023.
Henrik Syse (vice-chair, born 1966), research professor at the Peace Research Institute Oslo. Member of the Committee since 2015, appointed for the period 2015–2020.
Thorbjørn Jagland (born 1950), former Member of Parliament and President of the Storting and former Prime Minister for the Labour Party, current Secretary-General of the Council of Europe. Chair of the Norwegian Nobel Committee from 2009 to 2015. Currently regular member. Member of the Committee since 2009, reappointed for the period 2015–2020.
Anne Enger (born 1949), former Leader of the Centre Party and Minister of Culture. Appointed for the period 2018–2020.
Asle Toje (born 1974), foreign policy scholar. Appointed for the period 2018–2023.

References

2019
2019 awards